The 1993–94 NBA season was the 26th season for the Phoenix Suns in the National Basketball Association. During the off-season, the Suns signed free agents; A.C. Green, who won two championships with the Los Angeles Lakers in the 1980s, and also signed Joe Kleine. The Suns were led by Paul Westphal, in his second year as head coach of the Suns. All home games were played at America West Arena. The team got off to a 15–3 start after a 7-game winning streak in December, and held a 31–15 record at the All-Star break. At midseason, the team signed free agent Elliot Perry. The Suns won their final seven games of the season, finishing second in the Pacific Division with a 56–26 record.

Charles Barkley, an All-Star coming off an MVP season, led a Phoenix offense that had five players average at least 15 points per game or more, with Barkley averaging 21.6 points, 11.2 rebounds and 1.6 steals per game. He appeared in 65 games, missing 17 due to a quadriceps tendon injury. In addition, point guard Kevin Johnson was the other 20-point scorer, averaging right at the mark with 20.0 points, and led the team with 9.5 assists and 1.9 steals per game; he also finished fifth in assist per game in the league for the season. In addition, Cedric Ceballos showed improvement, averaging 19.1 points and 6.5 rebounds per game, but only appeared in 53 games due to a foot injury, while Dan Majerle provided with 16.5 points and 1.6 steals per game, and led the league with 192 three-point field goals, and Green contributed 14.7 points and 9.2 rebounds per game. Second-year center Oliver Miller averaged 9.2 points, 6.9 rebounds and led the Suns with 1.8 blocks per game, and Danny Ainge contributed 8.9 points per game off the bench.

In the Western Conference First Round of the playoffs, the Suns swept the Golden State Warriors in three straight games, where Barkley scored a playoff career-high of 56 points in a 140–133 road win in Game 3. However, after taking a 2–0 series lead over the Houston Rockets in the Western Conference Semi-finals, the Suns lost the series in seven games. The Rockets would go on to defeat the New York Knicks in seven games in the NBA Finals, winning their first ever championship.

Barkley and Johnson both returned to the All-Star Game, Barkley's eighth and for Johnson, his third and final All-Star selection. However, Barkley was injured and did not play in the All-Star Game, which was held in Minneapolis. At season's end, both players had earned All-NBA Second Team honors. Following the season, Ceballos was traded to the Los Angeles Lakers, and Miller signed as a free agent with the Detroit Pistons, while Mark West was traded to the Pistons for a future draft pick.

Offseason

NBA Draft

Roster

Roster Notes
 Small forward Richard Dumas was suspended indefinitely without pay by the NBA for refusing to cooperate in substance-abuse rehabilitation.

Regular season

Standings

Record vs. opponents

Game log

Regular season

|- align="center" bgcolor="#ffcccc"
| 1
| November 5, 1993
| @ L.A. Lakers
| L 108–116
|
|
|
| Great Western Forum
| 0–1
|- align="center" bgcolor="#ccffcc"
| 2
| November 7, 1993
| Sacramento
| W 132–110
|
|
|
| America West Arena
| 1–1
|- align="center" bgcolor="#ccffcc"
| 3
| November 9, 1993
| @ L.A. Clippers
| W 114–99
|
|
|
| Los Angeles Memorial Sports Arena
| 2–1
|- align="center" bgcolor="#ccffcc"
| 4
| November 10, 1993
| San Antonio
| W 101–93
|
|
|
| America West Arena
| 3–1
|- align="center" bgcolor="#ffcccc"
| 5
| November 13, 1993
| @ Houston
| L 95–99
|
|
|
| The Summit
| 3–2
|- align="center" bgcolor="#ccffcc"
| 6
| November 16, 1993
| @ Golden State
| W 116–104
|
|
|
| Oakland-Alameda County Coliseum Arena
| 4–2
|- align="center" bgcolor="#ccffcc"
| 7
| November 19, 1993
| Portland
| W 118–109
|
|
|
| America West Arena
| 5–2
|- align="center" bgcolor="#ccffcc"
| 8
| November 20, 1993
| Cleveland
| W 112–96
|
|
|
| America West Arena
| 6–2
|- align="center" bgcolor="#ccffcc"
| 9
| November 24, 1993
| Denver
| W 130–97
|
|
|
| America West Arena
| 7–2
|- align="center" bgcolor="#ccffcc"
| 10
| November 27, 1993
| Utah
| W 120–98
|
|
|
| America West Arena
| 8–2
|- align="center" bgcolor="#ffcccc"
| 11
| November 30, 1993
| @ Chicago
| L 113–132
|
|
|
| Chicago Stadium
| 8–3

|- align="center" bgcolor="#ccffcc"
| 12
| December 2, 1993
| @ Detroit
| W 102–101
|
|
|
| The Palace of Auburn Hills
| 9–3
|- align="center" bgcolor="#ccffcc"
| 13
| December 3, 1993
| @ New Jersey
| W 104–103
|
|
|
| Brendan Byrne Arena
| 10–3
|- align="center" bgcolor="#ccffcc"
| 14
| December 5, 1993
| @ Milwaukee
| W 117–98
|
|
|
| Bradley Center
| 11–3
|- align="center" bgcolor="#ccffcc"
| 15
| December 9, 1993
| Washington
| W 114–95
|
|
|
| America West Arena
| 12–3
|- align="center" bgcolor="#ccffcc"
| 16
| December 11, 1993
| @ Dallas
| W 114–103
|
|
|
| Reunion Arena
| 13–3
|- align="center" bgcolor="#ccffcc"
| 17
| December 13, 1993
| Milwaukee
| W 112–104
|
|
|
| America West Arena
| 14–3
|- align="center" bgcolor="#ccffcc"
| 18
| December 15, 1993
| Golden State
| W 110–104
|
|
|
| America West Arena
| 15–3
|- align="center" bgcolor="#ffcccc"
| 19
| December 17, 1993
| Orlando
| L 101–104
|
|
|
| America West Arena
| 15–4
|- align="center" bgcolor="#ccffcc"
| 20
| December 18, 1993
| L.A. Clippers
| W 116–109
|
|
|
| America West Arena
| 16–4
|- align="center" bgcolor="#ccffcc"
| 21
| December 20, 1993
| Indiana
| W 102–94
|
|
|
| America West Arena
| 17–4
|- align="center" bgcolor="#ffcccc"
| 22
| December 21, 1993
| @ Denver
| L 95–121
|
|
|
| McNichols Sports Arena
| 17–5
|- align="center" bgcolor="#ccffcc"
| 23
| December 23, 1993
| @ Seattle
| W 87–86
|
|
|
| Seattle Center Coliseum
| 18–5
|- align="center" bgcolor="#ccffcc"
| 24
| December 25, 1993
| Houston
| W 111–91
|
|
|
| America West Arena
| 19–5
|- align="center" bgcolor="#ccffcc"
| 25
| December 27, 1993
| Boston
| W 118–102
|
|
|
| America West Arena
| 20–5
|- align="center" bgcolor="#ccffcc"
| 26
| December 30, 1993
| Philadelphia
| W 119–107
|
|
|
| America West Arena
| 21–5

|- align="center" bgcolor="#ffcccc"
| 27
| January 4, 1994
| Seattle
| L 106–112
|
|
|
| America West Arena
| 21–6
|- align="center" bgcolor="#ccffcc"
| 28
| January 5, 1994
| @ Utah
| W 107–91
|
|
|
| Delta Center
| 22–6
|- align="center" bgcolor="#ccffcc"
| 29
| January 7, 1994
| @ Minnesota
| W 110–103
|
|
|
| Target Center
| 23–6
|- align="center" bgcolor="#ccffcc"
| 30
| January 9, 1994
| Golden State
| W 122–107
|
|
|
| America West Arena
| 24–6
|- align="center" bgcolor="#ffcccc"
| 31
| January 11, 1994
| Charlotte
| L 93–95
|
|
|
| America West Arena
| 24–7
|- align="center" bgcolor="#ffcccc"
| 32
| January 13, 1994
| @ San Antonio
| L 88–107
|
|
|
| Alamodome
| 24–8
|- align="center" bgcolor="#ccffcc"
| 33
| January 15, 1994
| @ Sacramento
| W 119–103
|
|
|
| ARCO Arena
| 25–8
|- align="center" bgcolor="#ffcccc"
| 34
| January 17, 1994
| @ Golden State
| L 99–104
|
|
|
| Oakland-Alameda County Coliseum Arena
| 25–9
|- align="center" bgcolor="#ccffcc"
| 35
| January 18, 1994
| Dallas
| W 113–103
|
|
|
| America West Arena
| 26–9
|- align="center" bgcolor="#ffcccc"
| 36
| January 20, 1994
| @ L.A. Lakers
| L 102–107
|
|
|
| Great Western Forum
| 26–10
|- align="center" bgcolor="#ccffcc"
| 37
| January 22, 1994
| Portland
| W 118–117
|
|
|
| America West Arena
| 27–10
|- align="center" bgcolor="#ffcccc"
| 38
| January 25, 1994
| @ New York
| L 96–98
|
|
|
| Madison Square Garden
| 27–11
|- align="center" bgcolor="#ffcccc"
| 39
| January 26, 1994
| @ Atlanta
| L 107–116
|
|
|
| The Omni
| 27–12
|- align="center" bgcolor="#ccffcc"
| 40
| January 28, 1994
| @ Philadelphia
| W 108–103
|
|
|
| The Spectrum
| 28–12
|- align="center" bgcolor="#ffcccc"
| 41
| January 30, 1994
| @ Boston
| L 94–106
|
|
|
| Boston Garden
| 28–13

|- align="center" bgcolor="#ccffcc"
| 42
| February 1, 1994
| L.A. Clippers
| W 108–106
|
|
|
| America West Arena
| 29–13
|- align="center" bgcolor="#ffcccc"
| 43
| February 3, 1994
| @ Portland
| L 105–126
|
|
|
| Memorial Coliseum
| 29–14
|- align="center" bgcolor="#ccffcc"
| 44
| February 6, 1994
| Chicago
| W 89–88
|
|
|
| America West Arena
| 30–14
|- align="center" bgcolor="#ffcccc"
| 45
| February 8, 1994
| @ L.A. Lakers
| L 104–107
|
|
|
| Great Western Forum
| 30–15
|- align="center" bgcolor="#ccffcc"
| 46
| February 9, 1994
| Minnesota
| W 111–106
|
|
|
| America West Arena
| 31–15
|- align="center"
|colspan="9" bgcolor="#bbcaff"|All-Star Break
|- style="background:#cfc;"
|- bgcolor="#bbffbb"
|- align="center" bgcolor="#ccffcc"
| 47
| February 16, 1994
| Portland
| W 126–100
|
|
|
| America West Arena
| 32–15
|- align="center" bgcolor="#ccffcc"
| 48
| February 18, 1994
| L.A. Lakers
| W 113–96
|
|
|
| America West Arena
| 33–15
|- align="center" bgcolor="#ffcccc"
| 49
| February 19, 1994
| @ Houston
| L 88–106
|
|
|
| The Summit
| 33–16
|- align="center" bgcolor="#ccffcc"
| 50
| February 21, 1994
| Sacramento
| W 112–86
|
|
|
| America West Arena
| 34–16
|- align="center" bgcolor="#ccffcc"
| 51
| February 24, 1994
| @ Minnesota
| W 120–101
|
|
|
| Target Center
| 35–16
|- align="center" bgcolor="#ffcccc"
| 52
| February 25, 1994
| @ Utah
| L 87–107
|
|
|
| Delta Center
| 35–17
|- align="center" bgcolor="#ccffcc"
| 53
| February 27, 1994
| New York
| W 92–78
|
|
|
| America West Arena
| 36–17

|- align="center" bgcolor="#ffcccc"
| 54
| March 3, 1994
| @ Golden State
| L 107–120
|
|
|
| Oakland-Alameda County Coliseum Arena
| 36–18
|- align="center" bgcolor="#ccffcc"
| 55
| March 4, 1994
| Minnesota
| W 106–101
|
|
|
| America West Arena
| 37–18
|- align="center" bgcolor="#ffcccc"
| 56
| March 6, 1994
| Utah
| L 92–103
|
|
|
| America West Arena
| 37–19
|- align="center" bgcolor="#ffcccc"
| 57
| March 8, 1994
| @ Charlotte
| L 89–97
|
|
|
| Charlotte Coliseum
| 37–20
|- align="center" bgcolor="#ccffcc"
| 58
| March 9, 1994
| @ Washington
| W 142–106
|
|
|
| USAir Arena
| 38–20
|- align="center" bgcolor="#ccffcc"
| 59
| March 11, 1994
| @ Miami
| W 122–107
|
|
|
| Miami Arena
| 39–20
|- align="center" bgcolor="#ccffcc"
| 60
| March 13, 1994
| @ Orlando
| W 100–93
|
|
|
| Orlando Arena
| 40–20
|- align="center" bgcolor="#ccffcc"
| 61
| March 15, 1994
| @ Cleveland
| W 119–106
|
|
|
| Richfield Coliseum
| 41–20
|- align="center" bgcolor="#ffcccc"
| 62
| March 16, 1994
| @ Indiana
| L 98–109
|
|
|
| Market Square Arena
| 41–21
|- align="center" bgcolor="#ffcccc"
| 63
| March 18, 1994
| Detroit
| L 113–114
|
|
|
| America West Arena
| 41–22
|- align="center" bgcolor="#ccffcc"
| 64
| March 19, 1994
| New Jersey
| W 105–93
|
|
|
| America West Arena
| 42–22
|- align="center" bgcolor="#ccffcc"
| 65
| March 22, 1994
| Miami
| W 124–118 (OT)
|
|
|
| America West Arena
| 43–22
|- align="center" bgcolor="#ffcccc"
| 66
| March 24, 1994
| @ Seattle
| L 106–116
|
|
|
| Seattle Center Coliseum
| 43–23
|- align="center" bgcolor="#ccffcc"
| 67
| March 25, 1994
| Dallas
| W 99–94
|
|
|
| America West Arena
| 44–23
|- align="center" bgcolor="#ccffcc"
| 68
| March 27, 1994
| Houston
| W 113–98
|
|
|
| America West Arena
| 45–23
|- align="center" bgcolor="#ccffcc"
| 69
| March 31, 1994
| @ L.A. Clippers
| W 117–102
|
|
|
| Los Angeles Memorial Sports Arena
| 46–23

|- align="center" bgcolor="#ccffcc"
| 70
| April 1, 1994
| Atlanta
| W 93–87
|
|
|
| America West Arena
| 47–23
|- align="center" bgcolor="#ccffcc"
| 71
| April 3, 1994
| Denver
| W 108–98
|
|
|
| America West Arena
| 48–23
|- align="center" bgcolor="#ffcccc"
| 72
| April 5, 1994
| @ Portland
| L 113–135
|
|
|
| Memorial Coliseum
| 48–24
|- align="center" bgcolor="#ccffcc"
| 73
| April 6, 1994
| San Antonio
| W 107–95
|
|
|
| America West Arena
| 49–24
|- align="center" bgcolor="#ffcccc"
| 74
| April 8, 1994
| @ Sacramento
| L 101–104
|
|
|
| ARCO Arena
| 49–25
|- align="center" bgcolor="#ffcccc"
| 75
| April 10, 1994
| @ Seattle
| L 108–111
|
|
|
| Seattle Center Coliseum
| 49–26
|- align="center" bgcolor="#ccffcc"
| 76
| April 12, 1994
| @ Denver
| W 107–102
|
|
|
| McNichols Sports Arena
| 50–26
|- align="center" bgcolor="#ccffcc"
| 77
| April 13, 1994
| L.A. Lakers
| W 117–88
|
|
|
| America West Arena
| 51–26
|- align="center" bgcolor="#ccffcc"
| 78
| April 16, 1994
| @ San Antonio
| W 96–94
|
|
|
| Alamodome
| 52–26
|- align="center" bgcolor="#ccffcc"
| 79
| April 18, 1994
| @ Dallas
| W 106–97
|
|
|
| Reunion Arena
| 53–26
|- align="center" bgcolor="#ccffcc"
| 80
| April 19, 1994
| Seattle
| W 122–116
|
|
|
| America West Arena
| 54–26
|- align="center" bgcolor="#ccffcc"
| 81
| April 22, 1994
| L.A. Clippers
| W 127–121
|
|
|
| America West Arena
| 55–26
|- align="center" bgcolor="#ccffcc"
| 82
| April 23, 1994
| Sacramento
| W 101–100
|
|
|
| America West Arena
| 56–26

Playoffs

Game log

|- align="center" bgcolor="#ccffcc"
| 1
| April 29, 1994
| Golden State
| W 111–104
| Charles Barkley (36)
| Charles Barkley (19)
| Barkley, Johnson (7)
| America West Arena19,023
| 1–0
|- align="center" bgcolor="#ccffcc"
| 2
| May 1, 1994
| Golden State
| W 117–111
| Kevin Johnson (38)
| A. C. Green (10)
| Kevin Johnson (9)
| America West Arena19,023
| 2–0
|- align="center" bgcolor="#ccffcc"
| 3
| May 4, 1994
| @ Golden State
| W 140–133
| Charles Barkley (56)
| Charles Barkley (14)
| Kevin Johnson (12)
| Oakland-Alameda County Coliseum Arena15,025
| 3–0

|- align="center" bgcolor="#ccffcc"
| 1
| May 8, 1994
| @ Houston
| W 91–87
| Charles Barkley (21)
| Charles Barkley (12)
| Kevin Johnson (12)
| The Summit15,073
| 1–0
|- align="center" bgcolor="#ccffcc"
| 2
| May 11, 1994
| @ Houston
| W 124–117 (OT)
| Charles Barkley (34)
| Charles Barkley (15)
| Barkley, Johnson (6)
| The Summit16,611
| 2–0
|- align="center" bgcolor="#ffcccc"
| 3
| May 13, 1994
| Houston
| L 102–118
| Kevin Johnson (38)
| Charles Barkley (14)
| Kevin Johnson (12)
| America West Arena19,023
| 2–1
|- align="center" bgcolor="#ffcccc"
| 4
| May 15, 1994
| Houston
| L 96–107
| Kevin Johnson (38)
| Charles Barkley (14)
| Kevin Johnson (12)
| America West Arena19,023
| 2–2
|- align="center" bgcolor="#ffcccc"
| 5
| May 17, 1994
| @ Houston
| L 86–109
| Charles Barkley (30)
| Oliver Miller (7)
| Henry, Miller (3)
| The Summit16,611
| 2–3
|- align="center" bgcolor="#ccffcc"
| 6
| May 19, 1994
| Houston
| W 103–89
| Kevin Johnson (28)
| Charles Barkley (15)
| Kevin Johnson (13)
| America West Arena19,023
| 3–3
|- align="center" bgcolor="#ffcccc"
| 7
| May 21, 1994
| @ Houston
| L 94–104
| Kevin Johnson (25)
| Charles Barkley (15)
| Kevin Johnson (11)
| The Summit16,611
| 3–4
|-

Awards and honors

Week/Month
 Charles Barkley was named Player of the Week for games played November 15 through November 21.
 Oliver Miller was named Player of the Week for games played December 27 through January 2.

All-Star
 Charles Barkley was voted as a starter for the Western Conference in the All-Star Game. It was his eighth consecutive All-Star selection. Barkley led all players in voting with 794,936 votes. Barkley was unable to play due to injury and was replaced by Gary Payton.
 Kevin Johnson was selected as a reserve for the Western Conference in the All-Star Game. It was his third All-Star selection. Johnson finished third in voting among Western Conference guards with 431,885 votes.
 Other Suns players receiving All-Star votes were A. C. Green (368,601) and Dan Majerle (329,618).

Season
 Charles Barkley was named to the All-NBA Second Team. Barkley also finished tenth in MVP voting.
 Kevin Johnson was named to the All-NBA Second Team. Johnson also finished 11th in MVP voting.
 Dan Majerle led the league in three-point field goals with 192.

Player statistics

Season

* – Stats with the Suns.
† – Minimum 50 three-pointers made.
^ – Minimum 125 free-throws made.

Playoffs

† – Minimum 20 field goals made.

Transactions

Trades

Free agents

Additions

Subtractions

Player Transactions Citation:

References

 Standings on Basketball Reference

Phoenix Suns seasons